Selected Songs 1999–2005 is a compilation album by the Finnish pop rock band The Crash, released in October 2005. The album includes the most important and meaningful songs composed during 1999–2005, but also three brand new songs: "Johnny Ran Away with You", "Big Ass Love", "Thorn in My Side".

There are two versions made of the album. One that includes only the CD, and one that offers also some DVD material; four music videos and an interview from 2003.

The album reached number 10 in The Official Finnish Charts.

CD
 Sugared
 World of My Own
 Fidelity
 Coming Home
 I Never Dance
 Lauren Caught My Eye
 Star
 New York
 Times
 Fireworks
 Still Alive
 Best of the Best
 Gigolo
 Flash
 Oh What a Thing
 Johnny Ran Away with You
 Big Ass Love
 Thorn in My Side

DVD
 Sugared
 Lauren Caught My Eye
 Star
 Still Alive
 Melodrama-interview

Band members
Teemu Brunila – vocals, guitar, keyboard
Samuli Haataja – bass guitar
Erkki Kaila – drums
Tomi Mäkilä – keyboard
Toni Ahola – keyboard

References

2005 compilation albums
The Crash (band) albums